Nedine is a genus of longhorn beetles of the subfamily Lamiinae, containing the following species:

 Nedine adversa (Pascoe, 1864)
 Nedine longipes J. Thomson, 1864
 Nedine spaethi (Heller, 1924)
 Nedine sparatis Wang & Chiang, 1999
 Nedine subspinosa Wang & Chiang, 1999

References

Desmiphorini